Air Vice Marshal Francis Rowland Scarlett,  (18 May 1875 – 15 April 1934) was a senior Royal Air Force commander.

Early and family life
Francis Rowland Scarlett was born on 18 May 1875, the son of Lieutenant Colonel William James Scarlett. At the age of 29 he married Dora Blakiston-Houston, the daughter of John Blakiston-Houston, an Irish Unionist Party politician. He was the father of Air Vice Marshal James Rowland Scarlett-Streatfeild who was killed serving in the Second World War.

Military career
Scarlett joined the Royal Navy in (or around) 1891, and held the rank of lieutenant when in July 1902 he was posted as 1st lieutenant on the training ship HMS Caledonia, anchored at the Firth of Forth. In April 1913 he attended the Central Flying School, being awarded his Aviator's Certificate no. 468 on 4 April 1913. He served in the First World War as the Inspecting Captain of Aircraft, of Air Stations and then of Air Training, gaining a promotion to wing captain at the close of 1915. In February 1916 he became Commander of all Royal Naval Air Service units in the Eastern Mediterranean and in May 1919 he was given command of No. 12 Group. He was created a Commander of the Greek Order of the Redeemer.

In December 1919 became was made Officer Commanding the No. 1 School of Technical Training at RAF Halton and on 22 January 1920, he was awarded a permanent commission in the RAF. He went on to be Air Officer Commanding Coastal Area in 1924, Air Officer Commanding Air Defence of Great Britain (on a temporary basis) in 1928 and Air Officer Commanding Fighting Area in January 1929. His last appointment was as Air Officer Commanding Middle East Command in October 1929 before he retired in the rank of air vice marshal in December 1931.

References

|-

|-

|-

|-

|-

|-

1875 births
1934 deaths
Royal Navy officers
Royal Air Force generals of World War I
Royal Air Force air marshals
Companions of the Order of the Bath
Companions of the Distinguished Service Order
Aviation pioneers